Royston Tan (born 5 October 1976) is a Singaporean filmmaker, director, screenwriter, producer and actor.

Tan is a graduate from Temasek Polytechnic, where he studied Visual Communications. He first came into prominence through his short films: Sons (2000), Hock Hiap Leong (2001), 48 on AIDS (2002), Mother (2002) and 15 (2002).  He has so far directed four features.

Filmography

Filmography as Director

Feature films

Short films
Adam.Eve.Steve (1997)
Jesses (1999)
Sons (2000)
Hock Hiap Leong (2001)
48 on AIDS (2002)
24 HRS (2002)
Mother (2002)
15 (short) (2002)!
The Old Man and The River (2003)
177155 (2003)
Cut (2004)
The Blind Trilogy:  Blind / Old Parliament House / Capitol Cinema (2004)
The Absentee (2004)
Careless Whisperer (2005)
New York Girl (2005)
Monkeylove (2005)
DIY (2005)
Cellouiod Dreams (2006), for the National Museum of Singapore's Living Galleries 
Sin Sai Hong (2006)
After The Rain (2007)
My SARS Lover (2008)
Little Note (2009)
Anniversary (2009)
No Admittance (2010)
Ah Kong (2010)
FishLove (2010)
I want to remember (2011)
Vicky (2014)
033713 (2014)
Bunga Sayang (2015), as part of the anthology 7 Letters
Provision Shop (2016)

Other work 
 Remains (1995) Music Video
 Erase (1996) Music Video
 Kisses (1997) Music Video
 4A Florence Close (1998) Home Video
 Birdsong (2010) TV movie
 Old Places (2010) TV movie
 Journey to the West Pioneer Generation Video (2015) Advertorial
 Voyage (2017) Multimedia musical
 High (2020) Interactive Film

Filmography as actor

Compilations
 Royston's Shorts (2006) - produced by Tan Bee Thiam

Awards 
1996
National Panasonic Video Award for Music Video for "Erase"

1997
UTV International Book Prize for "Adam.Eve.Steve"

1998
Bios MTV Awards 2nd prize for Music Video for "Kisses"

1999/2000
Hong Kong IDN Excellence in Digital Imaging Award for "Senses"

2000
13th Singapore International Film Festival
Best Short Film for "Sons"
Special Achievement Award for "Sons"

2001	 
Singapore Short Film Festival – The Voice Award for "Mother"
6th Malaysian Video Awards: ASEAN Director of the Year – Silver Award
23rd JVC Video Award – Silver Award for "Sons"

2002
The National Arts Council – Young Artist of the Year 2002
21st Uppsala International Short Film Festival (Sweden) – International Jury Honorary Mention for "Hock Hiap Leong"
6th Thai Short Film and Video Festival – Best International Short Film Award for "15"
Asian Television Awards 2002 – Technical and Creative Winner
Best of Show
Best Cinematography Award
Promax Asia 2002 – Silver  for "48 on AIDS"
15th Singapore International Film Festival – Special Achievement Award for Short Film "15"
"Fest Forward" – Audience Choice for "15"
Tampere International Film Festival – Jury's Diploma of Merit Award for "Hock Hiap Leong"

2003	     
Filmlet 2003 – Best International Short Film
Brief Encounter Short Film Festival 2003
Best International Short Film
Kurzfilmtage Winterthur 2003 – Promotion Prize of the International Competition 03
22nd Uppsala International Short Film Festival (Sweden) "UppsalaFilmkaja" Award
Mecal Film Festival – Special Mention for "15" (short film)
16th Singapore International Film Festival – NETPAC-FIPRESCI Jury World Critic Award for "15: The Movie"
Newport International Film Festival – Honorable Mention for "15"
Oberhausen Short Film Festival – Special Mention Award for "15"
Tampere Film Festival – Best Fiction Award for "15"
Hong Kong Independent Short Film & Video Awards – Asian New Force 2003 Critics Awards for Short Film for "15"
New York Film and Television Award – Silver for "48 on AIDS"

2004
Hall of Fame – Best Family TVC (Starhub)
10th Lyon Asian Film Festival – Press Award for 2nd Best Film for "15"
TIME Magazine – "Top 20 Asian Heroes"
Panasonic Digital Filmmaker Awards 2004 First Prize for "Cut"
2004 Busan Asian Short Film Festival Excellent Kodak Film Award for "15" (short film)
Buenos Aires VI Festival Internacional de Cine Independiente
Signis Special Mention Award for "15: The Movie"
Best Director Award for "15: The Movie"
Deauville Asian Film Festival – Special Jury Award for "15: The Movie"

2005
3rd Vladivostok Pacific Meridian Film Festival – Best Short Film for "Cut"
Clermont-Ferrand Short Film Festival – Canal+ Award 2005 for "Cut"

2006
 2006 Hawaii International Film Festival NETPAC award – (4:30)
 2006 Sapporo Short Shorts Special award – (Monkeylove)
 2006 HAF Award – "132"
 2006 Fitzroy Short Film Festival – Audience Prize for "Monkeylove"
 Geneva Black Movie Festival – Special Mention Award for "4:30"

2007

 Main Prize of the 5th Festival Signes de Nuit for "Monkeylove"
 Winner of the Silver Screen Gangster Award
 29th Clermont-Ferrand Film Festival Grand prix for "Monkeylove"

2009

 22nd Singapore International Film Festival – Singapore Film Awards: Best Director for "12 Lotus"

2010

 1st Singapore Short Film Awards – Honorary Award for "outstanding contribution to the film community through short films"

Accolades

In 2021 he was selected as Jury member for Sonje Award in 26th Busan International Film Festival to be held in October.

References

External links
 Royston Tan's 4:30 Interview on Youtube
 Royston Tan's blogspot
 

1976 births
Singaporean film directors
Temasek Polytechnic alumni
Living people